Fitch Bluestone Company Office is a historic office building located in Kingston, New York. Built for Ezra Fitch and Company in 1870, it is remarkable for the heavy use of bluestone in its architecture, as well as its involvement in Ulster County's bluestone industry in the mid to late 19th century.

Building

The Fitch Company office contains two stories built atop a stone foundation. Its walls make heavy use of bluestone. The building is further adorned with assorted styles of windows and other accents.

History

Ezra Fitch and Company was born when Ezra Fitch rose to the head of his family's shipping company, Fitch and Reed. Under his control, the company pivoted to handling bluestone, subsequently flourished in this new industry, and before long employed over a thousand personnel. It was in the course of this growth that the Fitch Bluestone Company Office was built. The large growth of the company was also instrumental in developing the Village of Wilbur.

See also
Kingston, New York, the city into which the Village of Wilbur was incorporated.

References 

National Register of Historic Places in Ulster County, New York